is a Japanese video game for the PlayStation 2 developed by Alfa System and published by Bandai. It has role-playing video game and world-controlling elements, and allows the player to follow a number of characters (such as Asuka Langley Soryu, Shinji Ikari, Pen², etc.) through multiple versions of the main plot of the anime Neon Genesis Evangelion. The PlayStation Portable port was released on 2006 as Neon Genesis Evangelion 2 -Another Cases-.

The 24 topics were named in total "Classified Information" (Kimitsu Jouhou). The topics considerably expand upon the back-story: Adam and Lilith are "Seeds of Life," settlers sent to Earth by a "First Ancestral Race," along with the Spears of Longinus. The various Angels seek out the Black Moon of Lilith because they are seeking Lilith, or Adam; and so on. While the information seems to have been based on extensive interviews with Hideaki Anno, creator of the franchise, the canonicity of the information in the game has never been officially stated, as the involvement of the original Gainax staff was limited to the Classified Information material. However, Gainax continuously states that all necessary information has been provided in the series and films.

Besides the additional information, Neon Genesis Evangelion 2 also introduced a number of additions like F-type Equipment and the final products of the Jet Alone project (as in some storylines, the eight episode does not end in the cancellation of the Jet Alone project), and includes several "Scenarios", including of comedic value, that disregard canon. Only Scenario 01, one of Shinji's scenarios, follows the series' own storyline relatively closely. The developers also state in a production log that they wanted to create their own "world of Evangelion". This is also expressed in their effort to create an "autonomous" simulation and characters. This allows the player to create numerous scenarios for characters, battles, and relationships.

Gameplay
The player controls the Eva walking around a large map, until they run into an enemy. The player is then given a list of action commands which they can choose to attack the enemy. Once one of the action commands is chosen, a sequence will be shown, created by CGI depicting the attack. This was one of the most praised elements of the game. The game also has story arcs in which the player has a list of playable characters to choose from, to play as in the story mode. For example, the 3 main characters Shinji Ikari, Rei Ayanami, and Asuka Langley Soryu, are available from the start. More are unlocked as various game events are triggered.

Reception
The game sold 111,787 copies the week of its release.

See also
 List of Neon Genesis Evangelion video games

References

External links
 IGN: PS2 PSP
 Classified Information translation + Japanese source text
 Short description of game
 Entry at Gamefaqs.com

2003 video games
Alfa System games
Japan-exclusive video games
Neon Genesis Evangelion games
PlayStation 2 games
PlayStation Portable games
Video games developed in Japan
Single-player video games